Jaime René Pinto Bravo (born 9 October 1939) is a retired professional tennis player from Chile. He reached his career-high singles ranking of World No. 73 in August 1973.

Life
Jaime Pinto Bravo was born in Chile and he played in Davis Cup for Chile. His daughter Anita Pinto is a professional squash player.

References

External links
 
 
 
 

1939 births
Living people
Chilean male tennis players
Tennis players at the 1967 Pan American Games
Pan American Games competitors for Chile
20th-century Chilean people